Argentina (minor planet designation: 469 Argentina) is an asteroid that was discovered by Luigi Carnera on 20 February 1901. Its provisional name was 1901 GE. 469 Argentina has an estimated rotation period of 12.3 hours.

References

External links 
 Lightcurve plot of 469 Argentina, Palmer Divide Observatory, B. D. Warner (2006)
 Asteroid Lightcurve Database (LCDB), query form (info )
 Dictionary of Minor Planet Names, Google books
 Asteroids and comets rotation curves, CdR Observatoire de Genève, Raoul Behrend
 Discovery Circumstances: Numbered Minor Planets (1)–(5000) Minor Planet Center
 
 

Background asteroids
Argentina
Argentina
X-type asteroids (Tholen)
19010220